Nebria vanvolxemi is a species of ground beetle in the Nebriinae subfamily that is endemic to Portugal.

References

External links
Nebria vanvolxemi at Fauna Europaea

vanvolxemi
Beetles described in 1874
Beetles of Europe
Endemic arthropods of Portugal